The National Convention Party (NCP) is a centre-left political party in Gambia. It was the main opposition party between 1975 and 1994. It was originally founded on 7 September 1975 when it first launched at Busumbala by former vice-president Sheriff Mustapha Dibba two weeks after his expulsion from the People's Progressive Party (PPP). It initially welcomed the 1994 coup but was banned from participating in elections in August 1994. Prior to the 1992 elections, the party faced a series of setbacks as many of its leaders rejoin the PPP. Its candidate at the presidential elections of 18 October 2001, Sheriff Dibba, came fourth with 3.77% of the popular vote.
At the last legislative elections, held on 17 January 2002, the party won no seats. 
When the party was formed, the then president of the country Dawda Jawara predicted that it would not last more than three months. The NCP was part of the Coalition 2016 for the 2016 presidential election, where Adama Barrow was declared the opposition's candidate and subsequently won.

References

Political parties established in 1975
Political parties in the Gambia
Main